The 2003 Canada Masters doubles was the men's doubles event of the one hundred and fourteenth edition of the Canada Masters; a WTA Tier I tournament and the most prestigious men's tennis tournament held in Canada. Bob Bryan and Mike Bryan were the defending champions but lost in the semifinals to Jonas Björkman and Todd Woodbridge. Mahesh Bhupathi and Max Mirnyi won in the final 6–3, 7–6(7–4) against Björkman and Woodbridge.

Seeds
Champion seeds are indicated in bold text while text in italics indicates the round in which those seeds were eliminated. All eight seeded teams received byes to the second round.

Draw

Final

Top half

Bottom half

External links
 2003 Canada Masters Doubles Draw

2003 Canada Masters and the Rogers AT&T Cup
Doubles